David Heymann is an American architect, writer, and educator. Heymann is most known for his 1988 design of an environmentally friendly house for then Governor of Texas George W. Bush and Laura Bush for their Prairie Chapel Ranch near Crawford, Texas. Heymann is a contributing writer for Places Journal. In 2014 he published a book of short stories, My Beautiful City Austin. He is currently the Harwell Hamilton Harris Regents Professor at University of Texas at Austin School of Architecture.

The Bush House

Deedie Rose, a Dallas arts and architecture patron, recommended Heymann to George W. Bush and Laura Bush to design the new house for their Prairie Chapel Ranch, which later served as their home away from the White House when Bush became president, during which time it was referred to as the Western White House.  Heymann designed three adjacent, single-level buildings, all clad in honey-colored native limestone: a three-bedroom house, a two-suite guest house, and a garage building.  Heymann sited the buildings and a swimming pool "into an almost imperceptible rise amid an existing grove of live oaks and cedar elms."

During the design process, Heymann would outline potential layouts on the ground so the Bushes could visualize how the house would work in each setting.  Heymann worked closely on the design with Laura Bush.  "She has a lot of experience from seeing the carefully organized houses that her dad built, and she has a very, very good eye," he says.  "One thing we wanted was to make sure the house fit into the landscape," Laura Bush said.  "I think it does, with the low house and the native limestone that looks very natural. It also takes advantage of the landscape with all the views."

The buildings were designed using strategies to achieve environmental sustainability. They are positioned using basic passive solar principles, absorbing winter sunlight, while being shaded in summer. A -wide porch encircles the main house, which in plan is "a narrow rectangle broken into an arc." The design takes maximum advantage of the breeze by being long and narrow – most of the house is only one room wide.

Heymann selected limestone quarried very close to the site.  "They cut the top and bottom of it off because nobody really wants it," Heymann says.  "So we bought all this throwaway stone.  It's fabulous.  It's got great color and it is relatively inexpensive."  The buildings use geothermal energy to heat and cool, and require less energy for that purpose.  A  underground cistern collects rainwater gathered from the roof.  Wastewater from sinks, toilets, and showers is also funneled into the cistern after being purified in underground tanks.  The water from the cistern is then used to irrigate the landscaping around the buildings.

The encircling porch provides a seamless transition from indoors to outdoors.  Most movement between rooms goes via the porch, and most of the windows of the house are full height doors that open onto it.  When the doors are all open the house "becomes a veritable pavilion."  Heymann says, "it’s a very simple idea: Outside is cold or warm, you’re in the sun or the shade or the wind, or you’re not, but that’s something you trust.  The sensation is real.  And direct."  "It's slightly motel-ish, but we love that," Mrs. Bush says.  There are no stairs or thresholds, Laura Bush points out.  "We wanted our older parents to feel comfortable here," she said.  "We also want to grow old here ourselves."

In 2017, Heymann completed the construction of a painting studio adjacent to the main house.  The studio gets its daylight from a north–south facing light monitor in the roof, with a lighting system designed to provide continuously balanced daylight-colored light.  The studio's north storage wall rolls into pockets, allowing the studio to be opened to the outdoors.

Honors

Heymann's architecture has been published in journals including Architecture, Architectural Record, Architectural Digest, Metropolis, Progressive Architecture, and Texas Architect. His design awards include a PA Award citation from Progressive Architecture magazine in 1994 for the design of Ontario Bible Church (now Oakwood Bible Church), one of two churches Heymann designed in collaboration with Laura Miller and Michael Underhill in Ames, Iowa. In 2000, Heymann was selected by the Architectural League of New York for inclusion in its Emerging Voices series. Heymann received the 13th Annual Heinz Award in the Human Condition in 2007. In 2014, he was elevated to the College of Fellows of the American Institute of Architects (AIA), the professional organization for architects in America.

Heymann has been a Visiting Artist / Scholar / Fellow at the American Academy in Rome, the Dora Maar House through the Museum of Fine Arts Houston, the Rockefeler Foundation at Bellagio, and the Bogliasco Foundation Liguria Study Center. He has been a resident artist in photography at the MacDowell Colony, the Ucross Foundation, and with the Arctic Circle Program. His Places Journal essay "Landscape is Our Sex" was awarded the 2012 Bradford Williams Medal from the American Society of Landscape Architects.

In 2003, Heymann was awarded the 17th annual Friar Centennial Teaching Fellowship (FCTF). Its honorarium is the largest for undergraduate teaching excellence at The University of Texas. Other teaching awards he has received include The Texas Exes Award for Teaching Excellence, the University of Texas Regents Outstanding Teaching Award, the 2002 Award for Outstanding Educational Contributions from the Texas Society of Architects, and inclusion in Design Intelligence's 25 Most Admired Educators in 2017.  Heymann is a University of Texas Academy of Distinguished Teaching Professor, and an Association of Collegiate Schools of Architecture Distinguished Professor.

Personal life
Heymann received his Bachelor of Architecture degree from The Cooper Union in 1984. He worked for the architects Tod Williams and Associates (now Tod Williams Billie Tsien Architects), and I.M. Pei and Partners, before receiving his Master of Architecture Degree from the Graduate School of Design at Harvard University in 1988. Heymann lives in Austin, Texas with his wife, Sandra Fiedorek.

References

External links
David Heymann's Architecture Website
David Heymann's homepage at The University of Texas at Austin
"My Beautiful City Austin", by David Heymann.
David Heymann / Columnist, Contributing Writer page at Places Journal.
"Q+A with David Heymann", by Kathleen Brady, June 30, 2016, Conflict of Interest.

20th-century American architects
Iowa State University faculty
Living people
University of Texas at Austin faculty
Year of birth missing (living people)
Cooper Union alumni
Harvard Graduate School of Design alumni
21st-century American architects